Chevie O'Brien Kehoe (born January 29, 1973) is an American convicted murderer. He is serving three consecutive life sentences for the kidnapping, torture, and murder of William Mueller and his family. His accomplice, Daniel Lewis Lee, was sentenced to death for the murders, and was executed on July 14, 2020.

Early life and education
Kehoe was born in Orange Park, Florida, United States. He was the oldest of eight sons born to Kirby and Gloria Kehoe, and was named after his father's favorite brand of automobile (Chevrolet). His father had served in the Navy during the Vietnam War. When Kehoe was an infant, his father moved the family to Madison County, North Carolina.

In 1985, Kirby moved the family again, this time to a property near Deep Lake in Stevens County, Washington. Kehoe entered Colville Junior High School as a ninth grader in 1987 where he was an honor student. Future serial killer Israel Keyes was a family friend. In 1988, his parents pulled him and his younger brother, Cheyne, out of public school, and from then on they were home-schooled.

Raised with increasingly extreme anti-government and white supremacist beliefs, Kehoe formed a plan to bring down the United States government with his self-styled "Aryan People's Republic" militia. Kehoe married Karena Gumm and the couple had three children. Kehoe took a second wife, Angie Murray in 1993, but the relationship only lasted for 54 days.

Crimes
In June 1995, Kehoe and an accomplice kidnapped and robbed Malcolm and Jill Friedman, a couple believed to be Jewish, who owned a store at which Kehoe was once employed.

Mueller family murders
In January 1996, Kehoe and another accomplice, Daniel Lewis Lee, left the state of Washington and traveled to Arkansas. On January 11, 1996, they arrived at the home of William Frederick Mueller, a gun dealer who lived near Tilly, Arkansas, and who was in possession of a large collection of weapons, ammunition, and cash. Kehoe and his father had previously, in February 1995, robbed Mueller once already, and Kehoe expected to find valuable property at the house. Dressed as FBI agents, the two men tried to enter the home of the Muellers, but they were not at home. When the Muellers returned, Lee and Kehoe overpowered and incapacitated Mueller and his wife, Nancy Ann Mueller (née Branch). They then questioned Nancy Mueller's 8-year-old daughter, Sarah Elizabeth Powell, about where they could find the cash, guns, and ammunition, forcing her to talk by shocking her with an electric cattle prod. 

After finding $50,000 in cash, guns, and ammunition, they shot each of the three victims with a stun gun, causing them to pass out. They then placed plastic bags over their heads, and sealed the bags with duct tape, suffocating them to death. There is some evidence that Lee was unwilling to kill Sarah, so Kehoe killed her. They took the victims in Kehoe's vehicle to the Illinois Bayou, where they taped rocks to them and threw each family member into the swamp. The bodies were discovered in Lake Dardanelle near Russellville, Arkansas in late June 1996.

Kehoe and his family took the stolen property to a motel in Spokane, Washington, by way of the Christian Identity community of Elohim City, Oklahoma.

William Mueller had put some of the stolen firearms into a Federal Firearms License registry as insurance against potential theft. The Bureau of Alcohol, Tobacco, Firearms and Explosives (ATF) used the ID numbers in the registry to trace the stolen firearms to several other men who confirmed they had purchased them in Spokane from Chevie Kehoe and his father Kirby.

1997 shootout
On February 15, 1997, Kehoe and his brother Cheyne were involved in a shootout with an Ohio State Highway Patrol trooper, John Harold Harker and a Clinton County, Ohio Sheriff's Office deputy, Robert Gates, in Wilmington, Ohio. The Highway Patrol trooper had stopped their vehicle, a blue Chevy Suburban, for driving too slowly and erratically on the road and found the license plate and registration had expired; the brothers also failed to produce any driver's licenses. Chevie, the driver, complied with the officer's orders to get out of the car but warned him against touching him when he tried to search him. The deputy noticed the trouble the state trooper was having with Chevie and stopped to help. As one of the officers called for a tow truck to impound the vehicle, Chevie suddenly began to dash back to the vehicle with the officers in pursuit. The officers had pinned Chevie to a patrol car and were trying to subdue him when Cheyne produced a handgun from his passenger seat and opened fire on the officers, allowing Chevie to jump back into the Suburban and escape. Cheyne himself fled into the nearby woods, where police searched unsuccessfully for him for the whole day. Later that day, Chevie was involved in a shootout in an electrical supply company parking lot with two Wilmington police officers, Ofc. Richard "Rick" Wood and Sgt. Robert "Bob" Martin. During the second shootout, a passer-by motorist, 56-year-old Frank Marsden, was hit in the shoulder. The two shootouts were recorded on both the trooper and the sergeant's dashboard camera in their patrol vehicle and was widely broadcast in the media at the time. Footage of the shootout was first aired in 1997 on FOX's World's Scariest Police Shootouts. It has since been shown on such television programs, among others, as Most Shocking and World's Most Amazing Videos.

On the run and arrest
After fleeing from police, Chevie and Cheyne Kehoe traveled secretly with their families through different states before settling in a ranch in Utah. They worked for the local ranch owner for a time, but disputes between the brothers over Chevie's extremist ideology grew bitter and eventually violent, and ultimately Cheyne left, taking his family with him. He subsequently surrendered to local police and directed them and the FBI back to the Utah ranch, where Chevie Kehoe was arrested on June 17, 1997.

In federal court Kehoe was charged with:
 Racketeer Influenced and Corrupt Organizations (RICO) statute (18 U.S.C. §§ 1962(c) and (d))
 Murdering in aid of racketeering (18 U.S.C. § 1959)
 Robbery conspiracy (18 U.S.C. § 1951)

Kehoe denied the criminal accusations against him and filed appeals. His appeals have been denied.

Sentencing
On February 20, 1998, Kehoe pleaded guilty in Ohio state court to felonious assault, attempted murder, and carrying a concealed weapon related to a February 15, 1997, shootout in Wilmington, Ohio, with an Ohio State Highway Patrol Trooper and a Clinton County sheriff's deputy during a traffic stop resulting from expired tags on his 1977 Chevrolet Suburban.

In 1999, Kehoe was convicted in federal court for the January 1996 murders of gun dealer William Mueller, his wife Nancy Mueller, and her 8-year-old daughter, Sarah Powell. He received three sentences of life in prison without the possibility of parole. Kehoe's mother Gloria and his younger brother Cheyne served as prosecution witnesses and testified against him at the trial. However, they both kept the secret until he got caught. Cheyne Kehoe received a 24-year prison sentence for attempted murder and weapons possession due to his role in the Ohio shootout.

Kehoe was imprisoned at United States Penitentiary, Florence ADX in Fremont County, Colorado, under Federal Bureau of Prisons register number: #21300-009. In November 2019 he was transferred to United States Penitentiary, Florence High On December 18, 2020, Kehoe was transferred to United States Penitentiary, McCreary in Kentucky. He was then held at United States Penitentiary, Big Sandy in Inez. As of 2022, he is held at United States Penitentiary, Terre Haute.

Oklahoma City bombing
Kehoe has been accused by his brother Cheyne and a Spokane motel manager of being involved in, or having prior knowledge of, the Oklahoma City bombing on April 19, 1995. Cheyne claimed to have knowledge of Chevie's involvement in the bombing shortly after he was sentenced for his role in the shootout. The manager of the Shadow motel in Spokane claimed to have seen Chevie with convicted bomber Timothy McVeigh at the motel four to six months prior to the bombing. The manager also claimed that on the morning of the bombing, Chevie showed up to the motel and asked him to put on CNN and became ecstatic when news of the bombing appeared. The manager also claimed that Chevie had told him in the days prior that something big would happen on April 19. Kehoe denied the allegations and the FBI found no evidence that McVeigh had ever travelled to Spokane.

Media
The Discovery Channel's docudrama series The FBI Files reenacts the behavior of Kehoe and Lee while also showing the forensic science used by the FBI to arrest them in season 2, episode 16, "Deadly Mission", originally aired: 2000.

The A&E criminal justice series American Justice profiled Chevie Kehoe's white supremacist motivations on season 10, episode 14, "Raised on Hate", originally aired on August 8, 2001.

References

1973 births
1996 murders in the United States
American people convicted of murder
American prisoners sentenced to life imprisonment
Inmates of ADX Florence
American white supremacists
Christian Identity
Living people
Oklahoma City bombing
People convicted of murder by the United States federal government
People from Clay County, Florida
People from Madison County, North Carolina
People from Stevens County, Washington
Prisoners sentenced to life imprisonment by the United States federal government